Cüneyt Köz (born 12 October 1992) is a German footballer.

Career
Köz is a product of Bayern Munich's youth setup, and made his debut for their reserve team in a 3. Liga match against Kickers Offenbach in May 2010, coming on as a substitute for Saër Sène. He made nine appearances the following season, including all five at the end of the season after Rainer Ulrich was appointed as interim manager, and was a regular fixture in the first-team's pre-season friendlies in summer 2011. After 31 appearances in the 2011–12 season he signed for Dynamo Dresden in summer 2012. Six months later he signed for Preußen Münster on a half-season loan.

References

External links 
 
 
 

1992 births
People from Eichstätt (district)
Sportspeople from Upper Bavaria
Footballers from Bavaria
German people of Turkish descent
Living people
Turkish footballers
Association football defenders
FC Bayern Munich II players
Dynamo Dresden players
SC Preußen Münster players
Kayserispor footballers
Balıkesirspor footballers
Bursaspor footballers
Bandırmaspor footballers
3. Liga players
Regionalliga players
Oberliga (football) players
Süper Lig players
TFF First League players